Marianne Wischmann (1921–2009) was a German film and television actress, as well as a renowned voice actress.

Selected filmography
 Third from the Right (1950)
 The Lie (1950)
 Abundance of Life (1950)
 Miracles Still Happen (1951)
 The White Horse Inn (1952)
 The White Adventure (1952)
 Scandal at the Girls' School (1953)
 I Was an Ugly Girl (1955)
 San Salvatore (1956)
 Malevil (1981)

Selected works as voice actress

Television
 ALF, German voice-over for Liz Sheridan
 The Nanny, German voice-over for Renée Taylor
 Roseanne, German voice-over for Shelley Winters
 The Muppet Show, German voice-over for Miss Piggy
 Why Didn't They Ask Evans, German voice-over for Joan Hickson

Film
 Alice Doesn't Live Here Anymore, German voice-over for Ellen Burstyn
 The Ant and the Aardvark, 17 theatrical cartoons (in Germany: television broadcast only), voice-over for the aardvark character
 Hush… Hush, Sweet Charlotte, German voice-over for Olivia de Havilland
 La Dolce Vita, German voice-over for Anita Ekberg
 Medea, German voice-over for Maria Callas
 The Revengers, German voice-over for Susan Hayward

References

External links
 

1921 births
2009 deaths
German film actresses
Actors from Düsseldorf
German voice actresses
German television actresses